Melkbelly is an American four-piece noise rock band from Chicago, Illinois, United States, made up of Liam Winters (bass), Miranda Winters (guitar/vox), Bart Winters (guitar), and James Wetzel (drums). They are known for their frantic arrangements, toothed melodies, and blaring live show. The group has toured extensively across the US in the last couple of years, and Stereogum called them the "Most Exciting Rock Band at SXSW". They released an album titled Nothing Valley on October 13, 2017, on Wax Nine Records, a subsidiary of Carpark Records.

Their latest album, PITH, was issued in April 2020.

Discography

EPs
2014: Pennsylvania

LPs 
 2017: Nothing Valley
 2020: PITH

7"s
2015: "B.A.T.B."
2016: "Mount Kool Kid" / "Elk Mountain"

References

External links

Musical groups established in 2014
Musical groups from Chicago
Rock music groups from Illinois
Carpark Records artists
Sibling musical groups
2014 establishments in Illinois